The 1972 United States presidential election in Nevada took place on November 7, 1972. All fifty states and the District of Columbia were part of the 1972 United States presidential election. State voters chose three electors to the Electoral College, who voted for president and vice president.

Since being won for the third time by William Jennings Bryan whose populism had attracted a state heavily dependent upon silver mining, Nevada had been a consistent bellwether swing state, although it had been trending Republican since World War II as air conditioning led to the development of Las Vegas as a “Sun Belt” city. Richard Nixon had narrowly lost this heavily Catholic state to John F. Kennedy in 1960, but would comfortably defeat both Hubert Humphrey and George Wallace in 1968. However, the Democrats had rebounded in 1970 to regain the governorship, although the party lost the attorney general position for the first time since 1890.

Nevada held no Democratic primary in 1972, and once McGovern's nomination was an established fact every poll suggested Nixon would win the state very easily, typically by around a two-to-one margin.

Nevada was won by the Republican nominees, incumbent President Richard Nixon of California and his running mate Vice President Spiro Agnew of Maryland. Nixon and Agnew defeated the Democratic nominees, Senator George McGovern of South Dakota and his running mate U.S. Ambassador Sargent Shriver of Maryland.

Nixon carried Nevada with 63.68% of the vote to McGovern's 36.32%, a victory margin of 27.36%. In a state that would reflect McGovern's national results, the Democratic nominee did not win a single county in Nevada, making Nixon only the second Republican after Theodore Roosevelt in 1904 to sweep all Nevada's counties.

Results

Results by county

See also
United States presidential elections in Nevada

References

Nevada
1972
1972 Nevada elections